The 2007 Zürich cantonal elections were held on 15 April 2007, to elect the seven members of the cantonal Executive Council and the 180 members of the Cantonal Council.

The FDP-SVP alliance gained a majority in the Executive Council by winning four seats. In the Cantonal Council, the SVP retained a plurality but the SVP-FDP alliance lost their overall majority, resulting in a more fragmented council.

Electoral system

Executive Council 
The Executive Council contains 7 members elected using a two-round majoritarian system. In the first round, electors have up to seven votes and the 7 most-voted candidates reaching an overall majority (>50%) are elected. If seats remain to be filled, a runoff is held where electors have as many votes as seats remaining, and the candidates with the most votes (simple plurality) are elected.

Cantonal Council 
The Cantonal Council is elected using open-list proportional representation, with canton-wide apportionment of seats and allocation into 18 constituencies (biproportional apportionment). In each constituency, voters have as many votes as there are seats to fill (panachage is permitted); these votes each count both for the candidate and for the list they stand in. These votes counts are divided by the seats count to give fictional electors counts which can be summed up fairly throughout the canton.

Using the fictional electors counts, each party above the threshold (reaching 5% in at least one constituency) is apportioned seats canton-wide, which are then shared among their constituency lists. In each constituency list, the seats are attributed to the candidates reaching the most votes.

This method was new compared to the simple allocation per constituency used in the last election; it was expected to help the smaller parties.

Candidates

Executive Council 
The FDP and SVP ran together as the “4 wins” ticket, hoping to together regain a majority on the Executive Council after having lost it to Hans Hollenstein in 2005. The FDP fielded incumbent councillor Ursula Gut (elected in a by-election the year before to replace retiring councillor Dorothé Fierz) as well as Thomas Heiniger (as a replacement for Rüdi Jecker who stood down) while the SVP ran incumbent councillors Markus Kägi and Rita Fuhrer.

The CVP ran without a formal alliance with the FDP and SVP but benefited from informal support. Incumbent christian-democratic councillor Hans Hollenstein ran for re-election as the party's sole candidate.

Both social-democratic incumbent councillors, Markus Notter and Regine Aeppli, ran for re-election.

Incumbent councillor Verena Diener had been elected in 2003 as a Green and had switched the next year to the Green Liberal Party; she did not run for re-election, opting to join federal politics by contesting the election to the Council of States. The Green-Liberals ran party leader and national councillor Martin Bäumle while the Greens fielded Illnau-Effretikon mayor Martin Graf.

Cantonal Council 
The table below lists contesting parties represented in the Cantonal Council before the election.

Results

Executive Council 
Note: percentages here are calculated based on the amount of valid votes (excluding blank and invalid votes) so that the absolute majority is at exactly 50%, but may result in candidates reaching over 100% of the valid votes.

The SVP and FDP's “4 wins” ticket succeeded with all four candidates elected and re-gained their seat lost two years earlier; both the FDP candidates polled significantly higher than the SVP ones. CVP candidate Hans Hollenstein also retained his seat in second place, along with both SP councillors. Green candidate Martin Graf and Green-Liberal candidate Martin Bäumle both failed despite reaching overall majorities.

Results by district

Cantonal Council 

The Swiss People's Party won a plurality but lost five seats, resulting in the SVP-FDP alliance losing their narrow majority in the Council. The social democrats suffered a loss of 17 seats, their losses were mainly attributed to voters switching to the greens (who gained five seats) and green-liberals (who entered the Council with ten seats). The CVP and EVP saw similar results to four years earlier, while the EDU gained four seats from the new apportionment rule. The Alternative List regained representation while the Swiss Democrats failed to clear the threshold of 5% in any of the constituencies. The resulting Council was seen as more unpredictable since it did not have any expected coalition anymore.

The SP's large losses were seen as the main change in this elections, though their outgoing 53 seats had been their highest seat count since 1955, meaning this election was only their worst result since 1987. The Greens and Green-liberals were seen as the main gains of this election, together now representing a sixth of the Council.

Results by constituency

References

2007 elections in Switzerland
Cantonal elections in Zürich